Merav Doster (born 1976 in Israel) is an Israeli female screenwriter. Merav Doster came to fame with her first feature film Eyes Wide Open.

Her first film was selected by the Cannes Film Festival in 2009, and competed for two awards: "Un Certain Regard" and the Caméra d'Or.

Doster currently lives in Tel Aviv, Israel.

Filmography

Eyes Wide Open (2009)

References

Israeli female screenwriters
Living people
1976 births